Mental Notes may refer to:

Mental Notes (Split Enz album), 1975 album
Mental Notes (Bad Manners album), 1985 album